Scott Michael Simon, Sr. (born June 1961), is a residential designer from Abita Springs, Louisiana, who is a Republican member of the Louisiana House of Representatives from District 74.

Simon is a residential/commercial designer and planner. He received his Master of Arts in Architecture from Tulane University in New Orleans. Simon is a member of the Louisiana Rural Caucus. First elected in 2007, he took office in 2008 to succeed current Louisiana Commissioner of Agriculture and Forestry Mike Strain. Simon was re-elected in 2011.

Political experience
Simon has had the following political experience:
Louisiana state representative, 2008–present
President, Jaycees Bridge City Council

Current legislative committees
Simon has been a member of the:
Health and Welfare, Chair

Caucuses/Non-Legislative committees
Simon has been a member of:
Freshman Caucus
Northshore Federation Legislative Caucus

Professional experience
Simon has had the following professional experience:
Residential/Commercial Designer and Planner
President, Jaycees Bridge City Council

Organizations
Simon has been a member of the following organizations:
Member, Governors Office of Disability Affairs
Member, New Heights Therapy Riding Center
Member, Families Helping Families
Member, TARC
UBoard Member, St Jane de Chantal 
Youth Director, St Jane de Chantal Youth Director
Member, St. Tammany Home Builders Association
Member, Northshore Republican Men's Club
Member, West St. Tammany Chamber of Commerce
Member, West St. Tammany FFA Alumni Association
Sponsor, Friends of Scouting
Adult Leader, Boy Scouts of America Troop 610
Sponsor, Northshore Cajun Dancer
President, Abita Springs Elementary PTO
Fundraiser and Builder, CJ Finn Ball Park
President, Abita Springs Recreation District 11
Coordinator, Youth Mission Work
Coordinator, St. Jane de Chantal CYO
Member, St. Jane de Chantal Parish Pastoral Council

Committee assignments
 Agriculture, Forestry, Aquaculture and Rural Development
 Commerce
 Health and Welfare

References

External links

Louisiana House of Representatives - Rep. Scott Simon
Legislative profile from Project Vote Smart
Biography from Project Vote Smart
Campaign contributions: 2009, 2007

 

1961 births
American politicians with disabilities
21st-century American politicians
Living people
American architects
Republican Party members of the Louisiana House of Representatives
Politicians with paraplegia
Tulane University alumni
People from Abita Springs, Louisiana
Catholics from Louisiana